This article lists events that occurred during 1963 in Estonia.

Incumbents

Events
Estonian Sports Museum was established.

Births

Deaths

References

 
1960s in Estonia
Estonia
Estonia
Years of the 20th century in Estonia